This list of the prehistoric life of Oregon contains the various prehistoric life-forms whose fossilized remains have been reported from within the US state of Oregon.

Precambrian
The Paleobiology Database records no known occurrences of Precambrian fossils in Oregon.

Paleozoic

 †Acteonina
 †Acteonina permiana – type locality for species
 †Albaillella
 †Albaillella asymmetrica
 †Albaillella sinuata
 †Albaillella triangularis – or unidentified comparable form
 †Alexenia – tentative report
 †Alexenia occidentalis – type locality for species
 †Alexenia subquadrata – type locality for species
 †Anidanthus
 †Anidanthus minor – type locality for species
 †Antiquatonia
 †Antiquatonia cooperi – type locality for species
 †Antiquatonia reticulata – type locality for species
 †Arceodomus
 †Arceodomus sphairikos – type locality for species
 †Arcochiton
 †Arcochiton soccus – type locality for species
 †Bajkuria
 †Bajkuria rostrata
 †Bathymyonia
 †Bathymyonia elongata – type locality for species
 †Calliprotonia
 †Calliprotonia inexpectatum – type locality for species
 †Changmeia
 †Changmeia bigflatensis – type locality for species
 †Changmeia bostwicki – type locality for species
 †Chauliochiton
 †Chonetes
 †Chonetes alatus – or unidentified related form
 †Chonetes pygmoideus – type locality for species
 †Chonetinella
 †Cleiothyridina
 †Cleiothyridina attenuata – type locality for species
  †Composita
 †Corwenia – tentative report
 †Corwenia ashwillensis – type locality for species
 †Crurithyris
  †Cummingella
 †Cystolonsdaleia
 †Cystolonsdaleia berthiaumi – type locality for species
 †Deflandrella
 †Deflandrella manica
 †Derbyia
 †Diadeloplax
 †Diadeloplax apiculatus – type locality for species
 †Dielasma
 †Dielasma brevicostatum – type locality for species
 †Dielasma rectimarginatum – type locality for species
 †Dielasma truncatum – type locality for species
 †Entactinia
 †Entactinia modesta
 †Entactinosphaera
 †Entactinosphaera cimelia – or unidentified related form
 †Eoparafusulina
 †Follicucullus
 †Follicucullus charveti
 †Follicucullus monacanthus
 †Follicucullus scholasticus
 †Follicucullus ventricosus
 †Gryphochiton
 †Gryphochiton planoplata
 †Haplentactinia – tentative report
 †Haplentactinia ichikawai
 †Hegleria
 †Hegleria mammilla
 †Heritschioides – tentative report
 †Himathyris
 †Himathyris gerardi
 †Homeochiton – type locality for genus
 †Homeochiton triangularis – type locality for species
 †Hustedia
 †Ishigaum
 †Ishigaum trifustis
 †Kashiwara
 †Kashiwara magna
 †Kleopatrina
 †Kleopatrina magnifica – or unidentified comparable form
 †Kochiproductus
 †Kochiproductus porrectus – or unidentified comparable form
 †Kochiproductus transversus – type locality for species
 †Krotovia
 †Krotovia barenzi – or unidentified related form
 †Krotovia oregonensis – type locality for species
 †Krotovia parva – type locality for species
 †Krotovia pustulata
 †Kuvelousia
 †Kuvelousia leptosa – type locality for species
 †Latentibifistula
 †Latentibifistula asperspongiosa – or unidentified related form
 †Latentifistula
 †Latentifistula crux – or unidentified related form
 †Latentifistula patagilaterala
 †Latentifistula texana
 †Leptodus – tentative report
 †Linoproductus
 †Linoproductus lutkewitschi – or unidentified comparable form
 †Marginifera – tentative report
 †Marginifera brevisulcata – type locality for species
 †Marginifera costellata – type locality for species
 †Marginifera multicostellata – type locality for species
 †Marginifera profundosulcata – type locality for species
 †Martinia
 †Martinia berthiaumei – type locality for species
 †Meekella
 †Monodiexodina – tentative report
 †Nazarovella
 †Nazarovella gracilis
 †Neoalbaillella
 †Neoalbaillella pseudogrypus
  †Neospirifer
 †Petalaxis
 †Petalaxis occidentalis – type locality for species
 †Polydiexodina
 †Polydiexodina oregonensis
 †Praedeflandrella
 †Probolionia
 †Probolionia elongata – type locality for species
 †Probolionia posteroreticulata – type locality for species
 †Proboscidella – tentative report
 †Proboscidella carinata – type locality for species
 †Protowentzelella
 †Pseudoalbaillella
 †Pseudoalbaillella fusiformis
 †Pseudoalbaillella globosa – or unidentified related form
 †Pseudoalbaillella lomentaria – or unidentified comparable form
 †Pseudoalbaillella longicornis – or unidentified related form
 †Pseudoalbaillella scalprata
 †Pseudotormentus
 †Pseudotormentus kamigoriensis
 †Pterochiton
 †Punctospirifer
 †Quinqueremis
 †Quinqueremis robusta – or unidentified related form
 †Rhipidomella
 †Rhynchopora
 †Rhynchopora magna – type locality for species
 †Rostranteris
 †Rostranteris merriami – type locality for species
 †Rostranteris sulcatum – type locality for species
 †Schwagerina
  †Siphonodendron – tentative report
 †Spiriferella
 †Spiriferella pseudodraschei – type locality for species
 †Spiriferellina
 †Spiriferellina pauciplicata – type locality for species
 †Stenoscisma
 †Stenoscisma americanum – type locality for species
 †Stenoscisma biplicatoideum – type locality for species
 †Stenoscisma mutabile
 †Stenoscisma mutabilis
 †Stenoscisma plicatum – or unidentified comparable form
 †Stigmosphaerostylus
 †Stigmosphaerostylus itsukaichiensis
 †Tiramnia
 †Tiramnia semiglobosa – or unidentified related form
 †Triplanospongos
 †Triplanospongos dekkasensis
 †Waagenoconcha
 †Waagenoconcha parvispinosa – type locality for species
 †Wellerella
 †Wellerella multiplicata – type locality for species
 †Wilsonastraea
 †Wilsonastraea ochocoensis – type locality for species
 †Yakovlevia
 †Yakovlevia brevisulcata
 †Yakovlevia transversa – type locality for species
 †Yokoyamaella – tentative report
 †Yokoyamaella oregonensis – type locality for species

Mesozoic

Selected Mesozoic taxa of Oregon

 †Acanthodiscus
  †Actinoceramus
 †Anahamulina
 †Anatropites
 †Arcestes
 †Arietoceltites
 Astarte
 †Bennettazhia
 †Bennettazhia oregonensis – type locality for species
 Cadulus
 †Calycoceras
 Cardinia
  †Cenoceras
 Chlamys
 †Cleoniceras – tentative report
 †Corum
 †Crioceratites
 Dentalium
 †Gervillia
 †Gryphaea
 †Gryphaea arcuataeformis
 †Hoploparia
 †Hypophylloceras
  †Inoceramus
 †Kilianella
 †Lantus
 Lima
 †Lissodus
 † Loffa
  Lopha
 †Lucina
 †Lyelliceras
 †Lytoceras
 †Mantelliceras
 †Metapolygnathus
 Milax
 †Modiolus
  †Myophorella
 †Myophorella argo – or unidentified comparable form
 †Neogondolella
 †Nerinea
 †Olcostephanus
 †Ophthalmidium
 Ostrea
 †Otoscaphites
 †Pachus – tentative report
 †Pachydiscus
 †Peronidella
 Pholadomya
  †Phylloceras
 †Phyllopachyceras
 †Plagiostoma – tentative report
 †Platymya
 Plicatula
 †Radium – type locality for genus
 †Scalarites
 †Scaphites
  †Shastasaurus
 †Shastasaurus pacificus – or unidentified comparable form
 †Spitidiscus
 †Thamnasteria
 †Tragodesmoceras
 †Trigonia
 †Trigonia montanaensis
  Turritella
 †Tutcheria
 Venericardia
 †Vermiceras
 †Xiphotheca
 †Zoneait – type locality for genus

Cenozoic

Selected Cenozoic taxa of Oregon

 Abies
 †Acamptogenotia
 Acanthocardia
 Abies
 †Acamptogenotia
 Acanthocardia
 Acer
 Acmaea
  †Acritohippus
 †Acritohippus isonesus
 Acteon
 †Actinidia
 †Actinidia oregonensis
 Admete
 Aechmophorus
 †Aechmophorus occidentalis
 †Aesculus
  †Aetiocetus – type locality for genus
 †Aetiocetus cotylalveus – type locality for species
 Aforia
 Agelaius – tentative report
 †Agriochoerus
 Aix
 †Aix sponsa
 Alangium
 Alnus
  †Alnus heterodonta
  †Amebelodon
 Amelanchier
 Ammospermophilus
 Ampelocissus
  †Amphicyon
 †Amphicyon frendens
 †Amphicyon galushai – or unidentified comparable form
 Amphissa
 †Ampullina
 †Anabernicula
 Anadara
 †Anamirta
 Anas
 †Anas acuta
 †Anas americana
 †Anas boschas
 †Anas carolinensis
  †Anas clypeata
 †Anas cyanoptera
 †Anas discors
 †Anas platyrhynchos
 Ancilla
 Anona
 Anser
 †Anser albifrons
 †Anser condoni – type locality for species
 Antillophos
 Antilocapra
 †Antilocapra americana – or unidentified comparable form
 Aphananthe
  †Aphelops
 Aquila
 †Aquila chrysaetos
 Arbacia
 †Archaeocyon
 †Archaeohippus
  †Archaeotherium
 Architectonica
  †Arctodus
 Ardea
 †Ardea herodias
  Argobuccinum
 †Ascosphaera
 Astraea
 Astreopora
 Astropecten
 †Aturia
 †Aucuba
 Aythya
 †Aythya marila
 Balaena
 Balaenoptera
  †Balaenoptera acutorostrata – or unidentified comparable form
 Balanophyllia
 †Balanophyllia elegans
 Balanus
 Bartramia
 †Basirepomys
 Bathybembix
 Bathytoma
 Bela
 Betula
 Bittium
 †Bonellitia
 Boreotrophon
 †Boreotrophon stuarti
  †Borophagus
 †Borophagus pugnator
 †Borophagus secundus – or unidentified comparable form
 Botaurus
 †Botaurus lentiginosus
 Brachidontes
 Branta
 †Branta bernicla
 †Branta canadensis
 Bubo
  †Bubo virginianus
 Buccinum
 †Buccinum strigillatum
 Bullia
 †Bumelia – tentative report
 Cadulus
 Calliostoma
 Callista
 Callorhinus – tentative report
 †Calocedrus
 †Calycocarpum
 Calyptraea
  †Camelops
 †Camelops hesternus
 Cancellaria
 Canis
  †Canis dirus – or unidentified comparable form
 †Canis edwardii
 †Canis latrans
 †Canis lupus – or unidentified comparable form
 †Carpocyon
 Carya
 Caryophyllia
 Castanea
 Castanopsis
  Castor
 †Catalpa
 Cedrela
 Celtis
 †Centrocercus
  †Centrocercus urophasianus
 Cercidiphyllum
 Cercis
 Cerithiopsis
 †Charitonetta
 †Charitonetta albeola
 Chen
 †Chen rossii
  †Chendytes
 Chione
 Chlidonias
 †Chlidonias nigra
 Chlorostoma
 †Choerodon
 †Chrysodomus
 Circus
 Cladrastis
 Clangula
  †Clangula hyemalis
 Cleyera
 Clinocardium
 †Clinocardium nuttallii
 Cochliolepis – tentative report
 Colaptes
 †Colodon
 Columbella
  Colus – tentative report
 Comitas
 †Comitas monile
 †Comitas oregonensis
 †Comitas spencerensis
 Comptonia
 Conomitra
 Conus
 †Cophocetus – type locality for genus
 Corbula
 †Cormocyon
  Cornus
 †Cornus clarnensis
 †Cornwallius
 Corvus
 †Corvus corax
 †Coryloides
 †Coryloides hancockii
  Craigia
 Crataegus
 Crenella
 Crepidula
 †Crepidula adunca
 †Crepidula grandis – or unidentified comparable form
 Cryptonatica
 †Cryptonatica affinis
 Cryptotis
 †Cunninghamia
 Cyclocardia
 Cygnus
 †Cygnus paloregonus
 Cymatium
  †Cynarctoides
 †Cynarctoides lemur
 †Cynarctoides luskensis – or unidentified comparable form
 †Cynelos
 †Daeodon
 †Dafila acuta
 †Daphoenodon
 †Daphoenus
 †Daphoenus socialis
  †Dasornis – or unidentified related form
 Decodon
 Dendragapus – type locality for genus
 Dentalium
 †Desmatippus
 †Desmatochoerus
 †Desmatophoca
 †Desmatophoca oregonensis
 †Desmocyon
  †Desmostylus
 †Desmostylus hesperus – type locality for species
 †Diceratherium
 †Dilophodelphis – type locality for genus
 †Dinaelurus
  †Dinictis
 †Dinictis cyclops
 †Diploporus
 †Diploporus torreyoides
 †Dipoides
 †Diprionomys
 Dipteronia
 Discinisca
 Dosinia
  †Dromomeryx
 †Dromomeryx borealis
 †Dyticonastis – type locality for genus
 †Dyticonastis rensbergeri – type locality for species
 Echinophoria
 †Ekgmowechashala
 †Emmenopterys
  †Enaliarctos
 †Enaliarctos barnesi – type locality for species
 †Enaliarctos emlongi – type locality for species
 †Enaliarctos mitchelli
 †Enaliarctos tedfordi – type locality for species
 Engelhardtia
 Enhydra
 †Enhydrocyon
 †Ensete
 †Epicyon
 †Epicyon haydeni
 †Epihippus
 Epitonium
  †Eporeodon
 †Equisetum
 Equus
 †Erismatura jamaicensis
 Erolia
 Ervilia – tentative report
 †Eucastor
  †Eucyon
 †Eucyon davisi
 †Euoplocyon
 Euphagus
 †Euphagus cyanocephalus
 Euspira
 †Euspira pallida
 †Eutrephoceras
 Exbucklandia
 †Exilia
 Fagus
 Falco
 Ficus
 Fimbria
 Flabellum
 †Floridaceras
  †Florissantia
 Fothergilla
 Fraxinus
 Fulgoraria
 Fulgurofusus
 Fulica
 Fulica americana
 Fusinus
 †Gaillardia
 Gari – tentative report
 Gemmula
 †Gentilicamelus
 Glycymeris
 †Goedertius – type locality for genus
  †Gomphotherium
 Granula
 Gyrineum – report made of unidentified related form or using admittedly obsolete nomenclature
 †Hadrianus
 Halesia
 Haliaeetus
 †Haliaeetus leucocephalus
 †Haplohippus
 †Hemiauchenia – tentative report
 Heptranchias
 †Heptranchias howelli
  †Herpetotherium
 Hiatella
 Himantopus
 †Himantopus mexicanus
 †Hippotherium
 †Hoplophoneus
 †Hovenia
 Hydrangea
 †Hypertragulus
  †Hypohippus
 †Hypolagus
 †Hypsidoris
 †Hypsiops
 †Hyrachyus
  †Indarctos
 Isurus
 †Isurus planus
 Juglans
  †Kalobatippus
 †Kardiasperma
 †Kardiasperma parvum
 Kellia
 †Keteleeria
 †Kolponomos
 †Kolponomos newportensis – type locality for species
 Lacuna
 †Lacuna vincta
 Larus
 †Larus argentatus
 †Larus californicus
 †Larus philadelphia
 Lepeta
  †Leptocyon
 Lepus
 Leukoma
 †Leukoma staminea
 Limnodromus
 †Limnodromus griseus – tentative report
 Lindera
 Liquidambar
 †Lithocarpus
 Littorina
 Lophodytes
 †Lophodytes cucullatus
 †Lophortyx
 Lynx
 Lytechinus
  †Machairodus
 †Machilus
 Macoma
 †Macoma nasuta
 Macrocallista
 Magnolia
 Mahonia
 †Malus – or unidentified comparable form
  †Mammut
 †Mammut furlongi – type locality for species
 †Mammuthus
  †Mammuthus columbi – tentative report
 Marcia
 Margarites
 Martes
 Martesia
 Mastixia
 Megachasma
  †Megalonyx
 †Megapaloelodus
  †Megatylopus
 Melanitta
 †Melanitta deglandi
 †Melanitta perspicillata
 †Meliosma
 †Meliosma beusekomii
 †Menispermum – or unidentified comparable form
 Mergus
 †Mergus merganser
 †Mergus serrator
  †Merychippus
 †Merychyus
 †Merycochoerus
 †Merycoides
 †Merycoidodon
 †Mesocyon
 †Mesohippus
 †Metalopex
 Metasequoia
 †Metasequoia occidentalis
 †Microphallus
 Microtus
 †Microtus montanus
  †Miohippus
 †Miotapirus
 Modiolus
 †Modiolus modiolus
 Molothrus
 †Molothrus ater – tentative report
 †Monosaulax
  †Moropus
 Mulinia
 Mustela
 †Mya
 †Mya truncata
 Myotis – or unidentified comparable form
 Mytilus
 †Mytilus californianus
 †Mytilus edulis
 †Nanotragulus – or unidentified comparable form
 Nassarius
 Natica
  †Nautilus
 Nectandra
 †Neohipparion
  Neophrontops
 Neotamias
 †Neurotrichus – tentative report
 Neverita
 †Nexuotapirus
 Nucella
 †Nucella lamellosa
 Nucula
 Numenius
 †Numenius americanus – tentative report
 †Nuphar
 †Nyssa
 †Nyssa spatulata
  Ochotona
 †Ochotona spanglei – type locality for species
 Ocotea
 Olar
 †Oligobunis
 Olivella
 †Olivella biplicata
 †Olivella pedroana
 Ondatra
 Opalia
 †Oreodontoides
 †Osbornodon
 †Osmunda
 Ostrea
 †Ostrea lurida – or unidentified comparable form
 Ostrya
  †Palaeocastor
  †Palaeolagus
 †Paleopanax
 †Paleopanax oregonensis
 Paliurus
 Pandora
 Panopea
 †Panopea abrupta
 Panthera
 †Panthera onca – or unidentified comparable form
 †Paradaphoenus
 †Paraenhydrocyon
 †Paraenhydrocyon josephi
 †Parahippus
 †Parahippus leonensis – or unidentified related form
  †Paramylodon
 †Paramylodon harlani
 †Paratomarctus
 †Paratylopus
 †Paronychomys
 †Paroreodon
 †Parrotia
 †Parthenocissus
 Passalus
  †Patriofelis
 †Patriofelis ferox
 Pekania
  †Pelagornis
 Pelecanus
 †Pelecanus erythrorhynchos
 †Pelecanus erythrorhynchus – tentative report
 Perognathus
 Peromyscus
 †Perse
 Phalacrocorax
 †Phalacrocorax auritus – tentative report
 Phalaropus
 †Phalaropus lobatus
 Phalium
 Phanerolepida
 †Philotrox
 †Philotrox condoni
 †Phlaocyon
 †Phlaocyon latidens
 Phoca
 †Phoca vitulina – or unidentified comparable form
  Phoenicopterus
 †Phoenicopterus copei – type locality for species
 Pinus
 Pitar
 †Plagiolophus
 Platanus
  †Platygonus
 †Pleiolama
 †Plesiocolopirus
 †Plesiogulo
 †Pliocyon – or unidentified comparable form
  †Pliohippus
 †Plionarctos
 Podiceps
 †Podiceps auritus – tentative report
 Podilymbus
 †Podilymbus podiceps
 †Pododesmus macrochisma
 †Pogonodon
 Polinices
 †Polypodium – or unidentified comparable form
 †Pontolis – type locality for genus
 †Pontolis magnus – type locality for species
 †Potamogeton
 †Pristichampsus
  †Procamelus
 †Promartes – or unidentified comparable form
 †Promerycochoerus
 Propeamussium
  †Protitanops
 †Protolabis – or unidentified comparable form
 Protothaca
 Prunus
 †Psephophorus – tentative report
 †Pseudaelurus
 †Pseudotsuga
 Pteris
 Pterocarya
 †Pteronarctos – type locality for genus
 Puncturella
 †Puncturella galeata
 Purpura
 Pyramidella – tentative report
 Pyrenacantha
  †Pyrus
 Quercus
 Querquedula
 Raja
 Rallus
 †Rallus limicola
 Recurvirostra
 †Recurvirostra americana
 Retusa
 Rhabdus
 †Rhizocyon
 Rhus
 †Rhus rooseae
 †Ribes
 Rimella
 Rosa
  Rubus
 Sabal
 †Sabia
 Salix
 Sanguinolaria
 Sassia
 Saxidomus
 †Saxidomus gigantea
 Scapanus
 †Scapanus latimanus
 Scaphander
 †Schisandra
 Schizaster
 Sciurus
 †Scutella
 Semele
 Sequoia
  †Sequoia affinis
 Siliqua
 †Siliqua patula
 †Simocetus – type locality for genus
  †Simocyon
 Sinum
 Solariella
 Solemya
 Solen
 †Somatochlora
 Spermophilus
 Spirotropis
 Spisula
 Spizaetus
 †Steneofiber
 Stercorarius
 Sterna
 †Sterna elegans – tentative report
 †Sterna forsteri
  Sthenictis
 Strongylocentrotus
 Sturnella
 †Suavodrillia
  †Subhyracodon
 Sveltella
 Symplocos
  Tapirus
 †Tapirus californicus – or unidentified comparable form
 Tapiscia
 Taranis
 Taxidea
 †Taxus
 †Taxus masonii
 Tegula
  †Teleoceras
 Tellina
 †Temnocyon
 †Tephrocyon
 Terminalia
 †Tetraclinis
 Thais
 Thesbia – report made of unidentified related form or using admittedly obsolete nomenclature
 Thomomys
 †Thomomys townsendii
 Thracia
  †Ticholeptus
 Tilia
 †Torreya
 †Torreya clarnensis
 Totanus
 †Toxicodendron
 Trema
 Tresus
 Trichotropis
 Trochita
  Trophon
 †Tsuga
 Turricula
 Turris
 Turritella
 †Tylocephalonyx
 Tympanuchus
 †Tympanuchus pallidicinctus
 Ulmus
 †Ursavus
 Venericardia
 †Viburnum
  Vitis
 Vulpes
 Xema
 Yoldia
 †Yoldia cooperii – or unidentified comparable form
 Zalophus
  †Zalophus californianus
 Zelkova

References
 

Oregon